Jeff or Jeffrey Moore may refer to:
 Jeff Moore (American football) (born 1956), American former football player
 Jeff Moore (basketball) (born c. 1966), American former basketball player
 Jeff Moore (pioneer) (1780–1835), American pioneer and founder of the town Russell, Kentucky
 Jeff Moore (soccer), American soccer player
 Jeffrey Moore, Canadian novelist, translator, and educator
 Jeffrey S. Moore (born 1962), American chemistry professor

See also
 Jeff Moores, Australian rugby league footballer of the 1920s and 1930s
 Geoffrey Moore (disambiguation)